Phalke is a surname in Maharashtra, India. Notable people with the surname include:

Dadasaheb Phalke (1870–1944), Indian producer, director, and screenwriter
Rohit Phalke (born 1997), Indian actor, writer, and director

See also
Falke

Indian surnames